Pavel Pulda (19 April 1949 – 18 July 1999) was a Czech sports shooter. He competed at the 1976 Summer Olympics and the 1980 Summer Olympics. He died on 18 July 1999, at the age of 50.

References

External links
 

1949 births
1999 deaths
Czech male sport shooters
Olympic shooters of Czechoslovakia
Shooters at the 1976 Summer Olympics
Shooters at the 1980 Summer Olympics
People from Pelhřimov
Sportspeople from the Vysočina Region